is a Prefectural Natural Park on the east coast of Miyagi Prefecture, Japan. First designated for protection in 1902, the park spans the municipalities of Higashimatsushima, Matsushima, Rifu, Shichigahama, and Shiogama. The park centres upon the eponymous pine islands of Matsushima (Special Place of Scenic Beauty).

See also
 National Parks of Japan
 List of Special Places of Scenic Beauty, Special Historic Sites and Special Natural Monuments
 Minami Sanriku Kinkasan Quasi-National Park

References

External links
  Maps of Matsushima Prefectural Natural Park (18 & 24)

Parks and gardens in Miyagi Prefecture
Protected areas established in 1902
1902 establishments in Japan
Matsushima, Miyagi
Higashimatsushima, Miyagi
Rifu, Miyagi
Shichigahama, Miyagi
Shiogama, Miyagi